Chaqa Narges (also Romanized as Chaqā Narges, Cheqā Narges, and Choqā Narges; also known as Angīlīse, Chīā Narges, and Chīa Nargīs) is a village in Chaqa Narges Rural District, Mahidasht District, Kermanshah County, Kermanshah Province, Iran. At the 2006 census, its population was 771, in 157 families.

References 

Populated places in Kermanshah County